Kostantin "Kosta" Alković (Serbian Cyrillic: Коста Алковић; Zemun, Habsburg Monarchy, 14 September 1834 - Belgrade, Kingdom of Serbia, 2 May 1909) was a physicist, professor of physics and mechanics from 1863 to 1892 at the Belgrade College, state advisor and minister of construction. He was also a member of the Serbian Academy of Arts and Sciences

Biography 
Kosta Alković was born in Zemun, then part of the Habsburg Monarchy, on 14 September 1834. After graduating from the Belgrade Lyceum, he received a state scholarship to pursue further studies at the Vienna Polytechnic Institute. He graduated in 1859 with a degree in mathematics, physics, mechanics and practical geometry from the Vienna Polytechnic. He was professor of physics and mechanics at the Lyceum and the Grande école (from 1862 deputy, and professor from 26 September 1863 to 1893); dean of the Technical Department of the Grande école (1868); rector of the Grande école (1885/1886 and 1891/92); regular member of the Serbian Academic Society; honorary member of the Serbian Royal Academy (1892); Minister of Construction of Serbia (from 9 August 1891 to 8 March 1893); and Deputy Minister of Education and Church Affairs (from 26 December 1892 to 4 January 1893).

Career 
Kosta Alković did not write textbooks or scientific papers, but he still followed scientific and technical achievements and tried to improve the physical cabinet with useful literature, including travel writing.

After returning from his studies abroad in Serbia in 1862, he was appointed deputy of the vacant chair of physics at the Belgrade Lyceum, and in 1863 he was appointed one of the ten professors of physics at the Belgrade Grande école which became the University of Belgrade. In addition to physics, he taught mechanics, and from the same year he also taught elements of meteorology and physical geography at the Military Academy. During his work, he was also the director of the physical cabinet. He celebrated a rare jubilee in 1887 - the 25th anniversary of his professorship at the Grande école. From 1863 to 1892 he was a professor of physics at the Belgrade's Grande école. From 1893, his work was continued by his students and colleagues Djordje Stanojevic and Milan Nedeljković. As the Minister of Construction from August 21, 1892 to March 20, 1893, in the government of Jovan Avakumović, he was awarded the Order of Saint Sava. He later served as an adviser to the Serbian government. He was highly decorated for his participation in the Serbian-Turkish wars of 1876-1878. In February 1870, he became a regular member of the Serbian Academic Society, and served as secretary of the Committee for Natural and Mathematical Sciences 1879/1880. In November 1892, he became an honorary member of the Serbian Royal Academy.

Konstantin Kosta Alković died on 2 May 1909 (Julian Calendar) in Belgrade.

References 

1834 births
1909 deaths
19th-century politicians
TU Wien alumni
19th-century physicists
Academic staff of the University of Belgrade
Government ministers of Serbia
Serbian physicists
People from Zemun